The 2023 Dutch Open (officially referred to as the 2023 TOTO Dutch Open Darts) was the 50th edition of the Dutch Open organised by the World Darts Federation and Nederlandse Darts Bond. The tournament was held at the De Bonte Wever in Assen, Netherlands.

The final day of the tournament was broadcast on RTL7. Matches was also be available to follow via the DartConnect application software.

Jelle Klaasen was defending his men's title, but lost in the semi-finals to Andy Baetens. Beau Greaves was defending her women's title, but lost in the final match to Aileen de Graaf who won fourth title of this tournament.

Prize money

Men's

Seeds
Seeding will take place in accordance of the WDF Main Table, version January 11th 2023. The players will be seeded in accordance with WDF regulations, but not always as the first match in the section. The first byes go to the seeded players, but after that the byes are equally divided across the sheets in a random place on the sheet. The provisional list of seeds and invited players is as follows. Berry van Peer was a champion, without a seeding position.

Draw

Women's

Seeds
Seeding will take place in accordance of the WDF Main Table, version January 11th 2023. The players will be seeded in accordance with WDF regulations, but not always as the first match in the section. The first byes go to the seeded players, but after that the byes are equally divided across the sheets in a random place on the sheet. The provisional list of seeds and invited players is as follows.

Draw

Boys (U18)

Seeds
Seeding was take place in accordance of the WDF Rankings for 11 January 2023. The players was seeded in accordance with WDF regulations, but not always as the first match in the section. The first byes go to the seeded players, but after that the byes are equally divided across the sheets in a random place on the sheet.

Draw (last 8 onwards)

References

Dutch Open
Dutch Open
Dutch Open
Dutch Open